La Poterie-Cap-d’Antifer is a commune in the Seine-Maritime department in the Normandy region in northern France.

History
During World War II, Operation Biting (also known as the Bruneval Raid) was a successful Combined Operations raid to capture components of a German Würzburg radar set at La Poterie-Cap-d’Antifer and evacuated by the Bruneval beach on 27/28 February 1942. On 6 June 1944, small boats simulated an invasion fleet headed towards the area as part of Operation Taxable.

Geography
The commune borders the English Channel and has a beach and some spectacular limestone cliffs.

Population

Places of interest
 The church of St. Martin, dating from the seventeenth century.
 The Cap d'Antifer Lighthouse.

See also
Communes of the Seine-Maritime department
Shipping Forecast, Antifer in the French system refers to Wight in the British system.

References

External links

Photos of Cap d'Antifer cliffs

Communes of Seine-Maritime
Populated coastal places in France